The Tour Noir is a mountain in the Mont Blanc massif on the Swiss-French border. It is located between the Aiguille d'Argentière and Mont Dolent.

See also
List of mountains of Switzerland

References

External links

 Tour Noir on Hikr
 Tour Noir on Summitpost

Mountains of the Alps
Alpine three-thousanders
Mountains of Valais
Mountains of Haute-Savoie
Mountains of Switzerland
Three-thousanders of Switzerland
Mont Blanc massif